The Manitou Cliff Dwellings are a privately-owned tourist attraction consisting of replica Ancestral Puebloan cliff dwellings and interpretive exhibits located just west of Colorado Springs, Colorado, on U.S. Highway 24 in Manitou Springs.

The attraction was established using replica and reconstructed Pueblo cliff dwellings in 1904 and was opened to the public in 1907. An associated private museum features commercially-developed displays about Ancestral Puebloan peoples including exhibits of archaeological artifacts, tools, pottery, and weapons from Indigenous sites and/or replicated by the company that operates the site. The replica dwellings were created as part of a commercial venture to divert tourists from Southwest archaeological sites by creating a version of a Pueblo dwelling place that was more easily accessible to early 20th century American visitors. Visitors can walk through the replica dwellings, and various displays and interpretive material attempt to imbue the entire attraction with a sense of authenticity, though the Manitou Cliff Dwellings are not themselves authentic.

History
The Ancestral Puebloans lived and travelled the Four Corners area of the Southwestern United States from 1200 B.C. to A.D. 1300. Ancestral Puebloan peoples did not permanently live in the Manitou Springs area, but lived and built their cliff dwellings in the Four Corners area and across the Northern Rio Grande, several hundred miles southwest of Manitou Springs. The Manitou Cliff Dwellings were built at their present location in the early 1900s, as a museum and tourist attraction. Some of the building materials were taken from a collapsed Ancestral Puebloan site near Cortez in southwest Colorado, shipped by railroad to Manitou Springs, and assembled in their present form as Ancestral Puebloan-style buildings resembling those found in the Four Corners. 

The project was directed primarily by Virginia McClurg, founder of the Colorado Cliff Dwelling Association. McClurg's creation of Manitou was highly controversial even at the time of its opening, in part because it was being promoted as authentic, and eventually caused the demise of the Colorado Cliff Dwelling Association and created rifts amongst Southwest archaeologists and enthusiasts. Edgar Lee Hewett, a famous early Southwest anthropologist, is widely cited at Manitou and in the attraction's materials as having approved of its construction, but in reality, Hewett was reluctant to legitimize the site and had little regard for the reconstructions. The McClurg family continues to operate the attraction to this day.

See also

Cave of the Winds (Colorado)
Garden of the Gods
Seven Falls

References

External links
Manitou Cliff Dwellings Museum
Tourist Information
Paul Weideman, "Like a magnet on Stonefridge," Santa Fe New Mexican, 7 Feb. 2008

Manitou Springs, Colorado
Landmarks in Colorado
Tourist attractions in El Paso County, Colorado
Native American museums in Colorado
Museums in El Paso County, Colorado
Cliff dwellings